Antal van der Duim and Boy Westerhof are the defending champions, but chose not to participate.

Seeds

Draw

References
 Main Draw

2015 Doubles
2015 in Dutch tennis
TEAN International - Doubles